Ro-63 or RO-63 may refer to:

 IMAM Ro.63, an Italian reconnaissance and light transport aircraft of 1940
 , an Imperial Japanese Navy submarine commissioned in 1924 and scuttled in 1946
 RO-63, a Finnish designation for the SS.11 wire-guided anti-tank missile